Ethos Capital is an American private equity investment firm founded in 2019 for the purpose of gaining control of the .org internet domain name and capitalizing upon it using a portfolio of data-monetization startups. Although that effort failed, company founders Erik Brooks and Fadi Chehadé went on to use the vehicle to buy domain name registrar Donuts and registry services provider Afilias from Abry Partners, where Brooks had been managing partner. In 2022, Afilias and Donuts were merged into a single company, Identity Digital.

Most of the press coverage of Ethos has focused on allegations of insider dealing between former ICANN CEO Chehadé (who registered the domain name ethoscapital.org in May 2019, one day after price caps were lifted from the .org domain) and current employer Ethos Capital, and the unraveling of a complex web of interlocking control and ownership between domain name registries, registrars, and ICANN, which nominally regulates the domain name industry.

References

External links
 

Investment companies of the United States
Private equity firms of the United States
American companies established in 2019